Martha Mwadinomho Kristian Nelumbu (born 1930) is the Queen of the Oukwanyama, a dynasty of the Ovambo people in northern Namibia. She was appointed in November 2005, succeeding her cousin Kornelius Mwetupunga Shelungu. She is the first woman leader to head this traditional authority.

Mwadinomho Combined School in Ondeihaluka is named after her.

See also
 Traditional leadership of Namibia
 List of current constituent monarchs

References

1930 births
Living people
Ovambo people
People from Ohangwena Region
Namibian chiefs